The 1978–79 DePaul Blue Demons men's basketball team represented DePaul University during the 1978–79 NCAA Division I men's basketball season. They were led by head coach Ray Meyer, in his 37th season, and played their home games at the Alumni Hall in Chicago. After starting the regular season unranked, the Blue Demons won 22 of 27 games to earn a top ten ranking and the #2 seed in the West region of the NCAA tournament. DePaul began tournament play by defeating USC and Marquette, then knocked off #1 seed UCLA, avenging a season-opening loss, to earn the program's second trip to the Final Four. Though the team fell to the #1 ranked and unbeaten Indiana State – led by NCAA Player of the Year Larry Bird – in the National semifinals, they bounced back to defeat Penn to claim third place. They finished the season with an overall record of 26–6.

Roster

Schedule and results

|-
!colspan=12 style=| Regular season

|-
!colspan=12 style=| NCAA Tournament

Rankings

^Coaches did not release Week 1 or Week 2 polls.

Source

Awards and honors
Ray Meyer – NABC Coach of the Year

References

DePaul Blue Demons men's basketball seasons
DePaul
1978 in sports in Illinois
1979 in sports in Illinois
DePaul
NCAA Division I men's basketball tournament Final Four seasons